Events from the year 1980 in Pakistan

Incumbents

Federal government
President: 
 until 18 August: Pervez Musharraf 
 18 August-9 September: Muhammad Mian Soomro
 starting 9 September: Asif Ali Zardari
Prime Minister: Muhammad Mian Soomro (acting) (starting 16 November)
Chief Justice: Abdul Hameed Dogar (acting)

Governors
Governor of Balochistan – Owais Ahmed Ghani (until 5 January); Nawab Zulfikar Ali Magsi (starting 5 January)
Governor of Khyber Pakhtunkhwa – Ali Jan Aurakzai (until 7 January); Owais Ahmed Ghani (starting 7 January)
Governor of Punjab – Khalid Maqbool (until 16 May); Salmaan Taseer (starting 16 May)
Governor of Sindh – Ishrat-ul-Ibad Khan

Events

January
2 January – Pakistan announces that elections originally scheduled for 8 January will be postponed until the 18 February, following the assassination of Benazir Bhutto.
3 January – Benazir Bhutto assassination: President of Pakistan Pervez Musharraf denies any role in Benazir Bhutto's death. (CNN)
11 January – Beginning of Islamic Hijri year 1429 First of Muharram on Friday 11 January 2008.
19 January - Saturday 9th of Muharram, Official holiday in Pakistan in memory of the martyrdom of Imam Hussain
20 January – Sunday 10th of Muharram, Ashura, an official holiday in Pakistan-In memory of the martyrdom of Imam Hussain
31 January – The United States announces that Abu Laith al-Libi, a senior commander of Al-Qaeda who recruited and trained operatives, was killed in a missile strike in northwest Pakistan

February
9 February – 15 People are killed in an election rally in Charsada.
11 February – Pakistan's ambassador to Afghanistan is believed to have been kidnapped by suspected pro-Taliban militants.
12 February – The Government of Pakistan steps up security for "fair, transparent and peaceful" elections scheduled for 18 February.
13 February – Pakistan test fires a nuclear capable short range ballistic missile.
Two suspects confessed to a judge that they helped to arm the suicide bomber who killed Bhutto.
14 February – Three soldiers are killed by a bomb explosion near Khair, Surabaja.
15 February – Pakistan announces the arrest of a fifth man in connection with the assassination of Benazir Bhutto.
Pakistan and India agree to double the number of flights between the two nations.
16 February – 37 people are killed in a bombing in the town of Parachinar at an election rally.
18 February – Elections take place in Pakistan.
19 February – Election results show that President Musharraf's party Pakistan Muslim League (Q) have received a heavy defeat.
21 February – Pakistan's two main opposition parties agree to form a coalition following the elections.
29 February – At least 45 people died and 82 were wounded in a suicide attack on the funeral February 29, 2008 of a district superintendent of police – killed earlier in the day in a separate attack – in Swat province.

March
22 March – The PPP nominate Yousaf Raza Gillani to become the Prime Minister of Pakistan.
25 March –  Yousaf Raza Gillani is sworn in as Prime Minister of Pakistan.
24 March – Prime minister Gillani vows to free judges who were detained during emergency rule.
29 March – PM Gillani announces to the National Assembly that the fight against terrorism will be the top priority of the new government.

April
1 April –  The new government of Pakistan announces that it will rethink the policy on militants.
15 April – President Musharraf announces he is lobbying the Chinese government to build gas and oil pipelines.
16 April – The Olympic torch arrives in Pakistan.
19 April – Taliban rebels release a video of Pakistan's ambassador to Afghanistan who they are holding as a hostage.

May
12 May – PML (N) quits the cabinet, following the failure to restore judges.
16 May – Pakistan's Ambassador to Afghanistan, Tariq Azizuddin was set free by kidnappers.
17 May – Lawyers announced their plan for Long March to be held on 10 June, for the Restoration of Judges.

June
1 June – Sheikh Rasheed Ahmed left Pakistan Muslim League (Q) and formed his new Party, Awami Muslim League.
2 June – Car bomb attack near Denmark Embassy kills 8 people. .

July
6 July – A suicide bomber attacked a police station in Islamabad killing 12 policemen and seven civilians in a rally marking the first anniversary of Lal Masjid siege.

August
 12 August – First National Youth Awards conferred.
 18 August – President Pervez Musharraf, faced with the prospect of being impeached, resigns from the office of president.
 19 August – 32 people were killed while 55 injured in an attack in Dera Ismail Khan carried by Tehreek-i-Taliban Pakistan.
 23 August – At least 15 people were killed in a suicide attack at a police check post in Char Bagh area of Swat. Also, three persons including two kids were killed in a bomb blast in Abuha.

September
9 September – Asif Ali Zardari became 11th President of Pakistan
20 September – The Islamabad Marriott Hotel bombing executed by unidentified terrorists kills 54 people and injures 266.

See also
2008 in Pakistani television
List of Pakistani films of 2008

References

 
Pakistan
Years of the 21st century in Pakistan
2000s in Pakistan